The Wolves is a 1956 Italian neorealistic drama film directed by Giuseppe De Santis.

Plot 
In a small mountain village in Abruzzo, near L'Aquila, two young wolf hunters—Ricuccio and Giovanni—arrive in hopes to collect 20,000 lire prizes for every wolf they can kill. Ricuccio finds himself charmed and entranced by the beautiful commoner, Teresa. She happens to be the wife of Giovanni and the two share a young son. The hunters risk their lives daily in the snow during the wolf hunts, only making it riskier because they are in constant conflict over Ricuccio's obvious attraction to Teresa.

After Giovanni is killed by a wolf pack while insisting on trying to capture a wolf by himself in order to collect a potential 60,000 lire selling price from a zoo, Ricuccio accompanies Teresa while they attempt to collect the bounties owed to the hunters. While the two bond, Teresa nevertheless rejects Ricuccio's marriage proposal. Afterward, Ricuccio becomes amorous with the daughter of a town elder and is threatened with the prospect of forever being alienated from Teresa, who may truly love him after all.

Cast 

 Silvana Mangano: Teresa 
 Yves Montand: Ricuccio 
 Pedro Armendáriz: Giovanni 
 Irene Cefaro: Bianca
 Guido Celano: Don Pietro 
 Giulio Calì: Nazareno 
 Euro Teodori: Amerigo 
 Giovanni Matta: Pasqualino 
 Maria Zanoli 
 María Luisa Rolando

References

External links

1956 films
1956 drama films
Italian drama films
Films directed by Giuseppe De Santis
Films about hunters
Films with screenplays by Ugo Pirro
Films scored by Mario Nascimbene
Films shot in Abruzzo
1950s Italian films